The 2017 Garbiñe Muguruza tennis season officially began on 2 January with the start of the 2017 Brisbane International, and ended on 26 October in Singapore. Muguruza entered the season as the number 7 ranked player and as the French Open defending champion.

Year in detail

Grass Court Series

Birmingham Classic
Despite falling out of top 10 following French Open, Muguruza started strong grass court campaign with semifinal showing at Birmingham Classic. She beat Elizaveta Kulichkova and Alison Riske before winning against Coco Vandeweghe, the same player she lost convincingly at Australian Open, with Vandeweghe retiring after losing second set. In the semifinal she lost to Ashleigh Barty in three sets.

Aegon International
In Eastbourne Muguruza lost in shocking way to Barbora Strýcová with winning only one game and being broken six times. Match lasted only one hour.

Wimbledon Championships
At Wimbledon Muguruza was non-top 10 seed for the first time at Major since 2015 Wimbledon, at fourteen. But being now underdog again, Muguruza showed once again quality tennis worth of a Grand Slam title, and she captured her first Wimbledon title beating Ekaterina Alexandrova, Yanina Wickmayer, Sorana Cirstea, world No. 1 Angelique Kerber, No. 8 Svetlana Kuznetsova, Magdaléna Rybáriková and five time champion Venus Williams, respectively. The only set she dropped was first set in match against Kerber. Muguruza's second Grand Slam titled propelled her again into top 10 at No. 7.

All matches

Singles matches

Doubles matches

Exhibition matches

Tournament schedule

Singles schedule
Muguruza's 2017 singles tournament schedule is as follows:

Yearly records

Head-to-head matchups
(Bold denotes a top 10 player at the time of the most recent match between the two players, Italic denotes top 50.)

Finals

Singles: 2 (2–0)

See also
 2017 WTA Tour
 Garbiñe Muguruza career statistics

References

2017 tennis player seasons
2017 in Spanish tennis
2017 in Spanish women's sport
2017